Preston is a city in Pratt County, Kansas, United States.  As of the 2020 census, the population of the city was 115.

History

19th century
In 1887, the Chicago, Kansas and Nebraska Railway built a main line from Herington through Preston to Pratt.  In 1888, this line was extended to Liberal.  Later, it was extended to Tucumcari, New Mexico and El Paso, Texas.  It foreclosed in 1891 and taken over by Chicago, Rock Island and Pacific Railway, which shut down in 1980 and reorganized as Oklahoma, Kansas and Texas Railroad, merged in 1988 with Missouri Pacific Railroad, merged in 1997 with Union Pacific Railroad.  Most locals still refer to this railroad as the "Rock Island".

Preston was founded in 1887.  Preston had a post office from 1887 until 1990.

Redevelopment
Although the city has been considered to be dying, the city is being revitalized. An Arizona undertaker has announced to build a crematorium in the city, helping to revive business there.  The city is being revitalized. A mortuary is currently open; and during 2011 a fabric store, a used carlot, a diner, and a convienence store are scheduled to open.

Geography
Preston is located at  (37.759981, -98.554549).

Demographics

2010 census
As of the census of 2010, there were 158 people, 67 households, and 43 families residing in the city. The racial makeup of the city was 98.1% White, 1.3% African American, and 0.6% Native American.

There were 67 households, of which 26.9% had children under the age of 18 living with them, 44.8% were married couples living together, 13.4% had a female householder with no husband present, 6.0% had a male householder with no wife present, and 35.8% were non-families. 29.9% of all households were made up of individuals, and 13.4% had someone living alone who was 65 years of age or older. The average household size was 2.36 and the average family size was 2.95.

The median age in the city was 40.5 years. 25.9% of residents were under the age of 18; 7.6% were between the ages of 18 and 24; 18.3% were from 25 to 44; 32.3% were from 45 to 64; and 15.8% were 65 years of age or older. The gender makeup of the city was 49.4% male and 50.6% female.

2000 census
As of the census of 2000, there were 164 people, 70 households, and 51 families residing in the city. The racial makeup of the city was 98.17% White, 0.61% Native American, 0.61% Pacific Islander, and 0.61% from two or more races.

There were 70 households, out of which 31.4% had children under the age of 18 living with them, 52.9% were married couples living together, 15.7% had a female householder with no husband present, and 27.1% were non-families. 27.1% of all households were made up of individuals, and 10.0% had someone living alone who was 65 years of age or older. The average household size was 2.34 and the average family size was 2.78.

In the city, the population was spread out, with 29.3% under the age of 18, 3.7% from 18 to 24, 25.6% from 25 to 44, 22.6% from 45 to 64, and 18.9% who were 65 years of age or older. The median age was 40 years. For every 100 females, there were 107.6 males. For every 100 females age 18 and over, there were 96.6 males.

The median income for a household in the city was $31,607, and the median income for a family was $31,429. Males had a median income of $29,375 versus $17,000 for females. The per capita income for the city was $12,899. About 8.9% of families and 8.7% of the population were below the poverty line, including 15.0% of those under the age of eighteen and none of those 65 or over.

Education
The community is served by Pratt USD 382 public school district.

Preston High School was closed through school unification. The Preston High School mascot was Wildcats.

References

Further reading

External links
 Preston - Directory of Public Officials
 Preston city map, KDOT

Cities in Kansas
Cities in Pratt County, Kansas